The 1975–76 Cypriot Third Division was the fifth season of the Cypriot third-level football league. Ermis Aradippou FC won their 1st title.

Format
Eight teams participated in the 1975–76 Cypriot Third Division. All teams played against each other twice, once at their home and once away. The team with the most points at the end of the season crowned champions. The first team was promoted to 1976–77 Cypriot Second Division.

Point system
Teams received two points for a win, one point for a draw and zero points for a loss.

League standings

Sources

See also
 Cypriot Third Division
 1975–76 Cypriot First Division
 1975–76 Cypriot Cup

Cypriot Third Division seasons
Cyprus
1975–76 in Cypriot football